Baqi (or ) may refer to:
 Baqi, Golestan, Golestan Province
 Baqi, Nishapur, Razavi Khorasan Province
 Baqi, South Khorasan, South Khorasan Province
 Baqi, Zaveh, Razavi Khorasan Province